Naval Base Palau may refer to US Navy Base during World War II at:
Naval Base Peleliu in southern Palau
Naval Base Angaur in southern Palau
Naval Base Kossol Roads in the northern Palau